Tegenaria bosnica is a species of funnel-web spiders found in Bosnia-Herzegovina, Croatia, Montenegro and Serbia.

See also 
 List of Agelenidae species

References 

bosnica
Spiders of Europe
Spiders described in 1940